Voldemar Krabi (also Voldemar Krabbi; 14 June 1893, in Paide – ?) was an Estonian politician. He was a member of II Riigikogu, representing the Estonian Socialist Workers' Party. He was a member of the Riigikogu since 26 March 1926. He replaced Aleksander Oinas.

References

1893 births
Year of death missing
People from Paide
People from Kreis Jerwen
Estonian Socialist Workers' Party politicians
Members of the Riigikogu, 1923–1926